You Are Too Much is a 2017 South Korean television series starring Uhm Jung-hwa, Jang Hee-jin (replacing Koo Hye-sun), Kang Tae-oh, and Jung Gyu-woon. The series aired from March 4 till August 27, 2017 on Saturdays and Sundays from 8:45 p.m. to 10:00 p.m. (KST) on MBC TV.

Synopsis 
The series revolves around a Yoo Ji-na impersonator who calls herself “Yoo Gina”. The real Yoo Ji-na is a pop diva who lived life to the fullest and one day, she becomes involved with her impersonator called “Yoo Gina” and their two lives become intertwined. Yoo Ji-na lives a glamorous life but she also harbors a personal tragedy that pains her deeply. Then there is “Yoo Gina” who works as an impersonator at a nightclub to eke out a living but wants to become a real singer herself.

Cast

Main 
 Uhm Jung-hwa as Yoo Ji-na / Kim Hye-jung
She is a pop diva aged 45. Her soulful voice that lifts people’s spirits has given her a career that has lasted over 20 years. She possesses a free spirit along with a glamorous look. She becomes envious of her impersonator, “Yoo Gina.” Upon seeing the girl’s boyfriend wait until the wee hours of the night to drive her home after the nightclub singing gig, she cannot but feel jealous. The sacrifices she made to build her career in the entertainment business have left her lonely in her personal life. Then, Chairman Park Sung-hwan who is a longtime fan of hers, asks her to marry him.
 Koo Hye-sun (episode 1-6) → Jang Hee-jin as Jung Hae-dang / Yoo Gina
Aged 33 she is a Yoo Ji-na impersonator who goes by the stage name, “Yoo Gina.” After her father lost his job and her mother died, she had to earn money to support the family so she found a singing gig at a nightclub where she was a Yoo Ji-na impersonator. Her dreams of becoming an original artist and producing her own songs were becoming more distant by the day. Her boyfriend is the only person who fully supports her and gives her the strength to go on. He is both her manager and driver. He makes her feel special even though she is just an ordinary girl desperately trying to make a living. But he has become attracted to someone else lately and that person is no other than the real Yoo Ji-na.
 Kang Tae-oh as Lee Kyung-soo / Yoon Sang-ah
 Kim Gun-woo as young Lee Kyung-soo
 Yoo Ji-na’s son. At the age of six, he lost his vision in an accident and abandoned at an orphanage by his mother. Unable to see, he kept waiting for his mother who never came. Thanks to a benefactor, he was able to take piano lessons and learn the piano. By age 25, he owns a cafe. He uses the alias "Yoon Sang-ah" when giving private piano lessons and playing music at events. While playing the piano, Hae-dang sings along to the tune, and her voice is uncannily similar to his mother’s voice.
 Jung Gyu-woon as Park Hyun-joon
 Park Sung-hwan’s eldest son, aged 37. He runs a talent agency.  Although he is the spitting image of his dad, he takes after his mom’s warm and loving personality. His mother donated to the cause for disabled people and Hyun-joon also volunteers to help them. His dad married his mom for her money and after her death, he announces that he will marry Yoo Ji-na. Already suspecting that his paternal grandmother and dad seized control of mom's family company and drove her to suicide, he plans to exact revenge on his dad with a terrible plan.

Supporting

Hae Dang's Family
 Kang Nam-gil as Jung Kang-shik, Hae-dang's father, operates a gas station after his original business collapsed
 Shin Da-eun as Jung Hae-jin, lectures at university and aspires to be a professor
 Kim Kyoo-sun as Jung Hae-sung, teacher who aspires to be a writer
 Jung Hae-na as Jung Hae-soo, youngest sister who just graduated from college

Hyun Joon's Family 
 Jun Kwang-ryul as Park Sung-hwan
 Hyun-joon's father, aged 63. The only son of Sung Kyung-ja, their family came from a humble background but used unscrupulous means so he could become CEO of the family firm GR Group.  Recently widowed who wants to marry Yoo Jin-na who is 18 years his junior, despite opposition from his mother and sons.
 Jung Hye-sun as Sung Kyung-ja
 Sung-hwan's mother, aged 83
 Lee Hwa-young as Choi Kyung-ae
 Sung-hwan's late wife, daughter of the founder of GR Group and philanthropist, benefactor of Lee Kyung-soo
 Son Tae-young as Hong Yoon-hee
 Hyun-joon's fiancee though an upcoming arranged marriage, comes from a distinguished family, as her paternal grandfather was a university president, while her maternal side has several relatives in government officials.
 Eru as Park Hyun-sung
 Hyun-joon's younger brother, largely obedient to their father, who works as an executive in GR Group. Married Go Na-kyung in an arranged marriage despite loving another woman.
 Yoon A-jung as Go Na-kyung
 Hyun-sung's wife, age 35, the homemaker in the Park household. Comes from a humble background but finished college and married into the Park family thanks to Kyung-ja who selected Na-kyung over daughters of wealthy families.

Hae-jin's Family
 Kim Bo-yeon as Baek Mi-sook
Yun Bong-soo's mother and Hae-jin's mother-in-law
 Kim Hyung-bum as Yun Bong-soo
 Hae-jin's husband, Mi-sook's son
 Lee Jae-eun as Yun Bong-sun
 Hae-jin's sister-in-law, Mi-sook's daughter, divorced from a previous marriage
 Jung Hyun Joon as Yun Ji-hoon
 Hae-jin and Bong-soo's son
 Bae Yoon-kyung as Ji-ha
 Choi Jung-woo as Jeong-woo

Others 
 Choi Jung-won as Im Chul-woo

Production 
On March 23, 2017, Ku Hye-sun dropped out due to a serious allergic reaction. In her place, Jang Hee-Jin was cast to play Jung Hae-Dang for the rest of the series.

Viewership 
In this table,  represent the lowest ratings and  represent the highest ratings.

Notes
Episode 16 did not air on April 23 due to the broadcast of a presidential candidates' debate.
Episode 22 did not air on May 20 due to the broadcast of the 2017 FIFA U-20 World Cup match between South Korea and Guinea.
Episode 47 broadcast on 19 August 2017 to start later than usual (9:20PM KST) due to a political program.
Episode 48 broadcast on 20 August 2017 to start later than usual (9:20PM KST) due to a political program.

References

External links
 You Are Too Much at Victory Contents 
  
 

MBC TV television dramas
2017 South Korean television series debuts
2017 South Korean television series endings
Korean-language television shows
South Korean musical television series
Television series by Victory Contents